Le Douanier is a wash-rinsed cheese made by Fritz Kaiser in Quebec, Canada. It is similar to a Morbier. Le Douanier won the 2004 Canadian Cheese Grand Prix. It also won a Gold award (entry class 5316, number 15) at World Cheese Awards 2015. It is a surface-ripened cheese, ivory in colour and has a little bit of a hazelnut flavour that comes out with age.

The wheel of cheese has an edible vegetable line running through its center. This symbolizes the Canada–US border that is very near the Fritz Kaiser fromagerie at which Le Douanier is made. The English translation of the cheese's French name, "Le Douanier", is "the customs officer".

See also
 List of cheeses

References

External links
Information about La Douanier on the Fritz Kaiser website

Canadian cheeses
Cow's-milk cheeses
Cuisine of Quebec